Odotobri is one of the constituencies represented in the Parliament of Ghana. It elects one Member of Parliament (MP) by the first past the post system of election

Emmanuel Akwasi Gyamfi is the current member of parliament for the constituency. He was elected on the ticket of the New Patriotic Party (NPP) in 2008 and won with a majority of 19,768 votes. He had also represented the constituency in the 4th Republic parliament in 2004.

References 

Parliamentary constituencies in the Ashanti Region